The Project is a BBC two-part 2002 television drama, directed by Peter Kosminsky from a script by Leigh Jackson.

The series presented a fictionalised account (though said to be closely based on research), seen through the experiences of three young activists, of developments in the Labour Party and its progress into Blairism, from the party's failure to win the 1992 General Election through its election victory in 1997 to its re-election victory in 2001.

The first part, "Opposition", was first shown on 10 November 2002, with the second part "Government" shown the next night (divided into two parts), both on BBC One. The cast included Matthew Macfadyen, Naomie Harris and Paloma Baeza.

The series was shown by the Franco-German network ARTE in September 2003, under the title Les années Tony Blair (The Tony Blair years) / Projekt Machtwechsel (Project 'Power Change').

Cast 
(in credits order)  

 Matthew Macfadyen as Paul Tibbenham
 Naomie Harris as Maggie Dunn
 Paloma Baeza as Irene Lloyd
 James Frain as Harvey
 Kaye Wragg as Lindsey
 Anton Lesser as Stanley Hall
 Shaun Evans as Andy Clark
 Andrew Shield as Security Guard
 Adam Croasdell as Josh
 Patrick Romer as George Dutton
 Paul Butterworth as Roger
 Duncan Law as John
 Christabel Muir as Toni
 Yvonne Riley as Ruth
 Amanda Richardson as Jenny
 Derek Riddell as Richard Loach
 Ben Miles as Jeremy
 Jordan Murphy as Young Ray
 Jonathan Aris as Bob
 Peter Wight as Neville (as Peter Wright)
 Emma Cleasby as Martha
 Silas Carson as Clive
 Crispin Bonham-Carter as Charles
 Alexandra Gilbreath as Deborah
 Alex Avery as Lib-Dem Candidate
 Maurice Yeoman as Jacob
 Danielle McCormack as Maria
 Robin Pearce as Claxton
 Paul Viragh as Alex
 Tristan Sturrock as Sean Sealey
 Emma Pierson as Juliette
 Rupert Ward-Lewis as Activist Agriculture Secretary
 Michael Brophy as Activist Health Secretary
 Catherine Hamilton as Activist Trade Secretary
 Holly Atkins as Carol
 Christina Cole as Lizzie
 Will Knightley as Alan Dunn
 Yvonne O'Grady as Eileen Dunn
 David Birkin as Nicholas
 Vivienne Ritchie as MP's Mistress
 Ian Driver as Tim
 John Arthur as Drake
 Alexander Perkins as Luke
 Keely Watson as Older Nell
 Hannah Yelland as Penny
 Sean Baker as Eddy
 Teresa Banham as Sian
 Joanne Baxter as Teacher
 Stephen Chapman as Whip
 Claire Adamson as Jane
 Jason Merrells as Dougie
 Pip Torrens as MoD Official
 Philip Dunbar as Donald
 Elliot Cowan as Gavin
 Colin Mace as Trevor

References

External links

Films directed by Peter Kosminsky
2000s British television miniseries
2000s French television miniseries
2002 television films
2002 films
2002 French television series debuts
2002 French television series endings
2002 British television series debuts
2002 British television series endings